After 7 is the debut album by After 7. Released in 1989, the album was certified platinum by the RIAA on November 27, 1990, and spawned two #1 R&B hits, "Ready or Not" and "Can't Stop." Those songs also reached #7 and #6, respectively, on the Billboard Hot 100.

Critical reception
The Rolling Stone Album Guide wrote that the album "benefits more from the ingenuity of producers L.A. Reid and BabyFace than from the skill of singers Melvin and Kevon Edmonds."

Track listing
"Don't Cha' Think" – 3:59 (Don Parks, Daryl Simmons, Kayo)
"Heat of the Moment" – 4:27 (Babyface, L.A. Reid)
"Can't Stop" – 4:07 (Babyface, Reid)
"My Only Woman" – 4:41 (Kayo, Reid, Simmons)
"Love's Been So Nice" – 4:27 (Babyface, Parks)
"One Night" – 5:00 (Babyface, Reid)
"Ready or Not" – 4:35 (Babyface, Reid)
"Sayonara" – 4:03 (Babyface, Reid)

Personnel
Keith Mitchell, Kevon Edmonds, Melvin Edmonds: Vocals
L.A. Reid: Drums, Percussion
Babyface: Keyboards, Bass
Kayo: Moog Bass, Keyboards, Drums, Percussion
Daryl Simmons: Keyboards, Drums, Percussion
Donald Parks: Synthesizer Programming (Fairlight CMI, Oberheim OB-8, Emulator II, Yamaha DX7)
Dee Bristol, Kathy Hazzard, Lynn Mabry: Additional Vocal Backing

Production
Tracks 1 and 4 arranged, produced and mixed by De'rock and Kayo.  Recorded by David Rideau.  
Tracks 2, 3, 5, 6, 7 and 8 arranged and produced by L.A. & Babyface; tracks 2, 6 and 7 co-produced by De'rock and Kayo.  Track 2 recorded by David Rideau and Tim Jacquette; mixed by Keith Cohen and L.A. Reid.  Track 3 recorded by Jon Gass, Jon Gaggenheim and Keith Cohen; mixed by Keith Cohen.  Track 5 recorded by Jon Gass; mixed by Barney Perkins, De'rock and Kayo.  Track 6 recorded by David Rideau, Donnell Sullivan and Jon Gass; mixed by Keith Cohen.  Track 7 recorded by Donnell Sullivan and Jon Gass; mixed by Barney Perkins.  Track 8 recorded by Jon Gass; mixed by De'rock, Kayo and Keith Cohen.
Mastered at Bernie Grundman Mastering.

Charts

Weekly charts

Year-end charts

Notes

1989 debut albums
After 7 albums
Albums produced by L.A. Reid
Albums produced by Babyface (musician)
Virgin Records albums